The Republic of Ireland had a population of 5,123,536 at the 2022 census.

Demographic history 

The island of Ireland's population has fluctuated over history. In the 18th and early 19th centuries, Ireland experienced a major population boom as a result of the Agricultural and Industrial Revolutions. In the 50-year period 1790–1840, the population of the island doubled from 4 million to 8 million. At its peak, Ireland's population density was similar to that of England and continental Europe.

This changed dramatically with the Great Famine of the mid-19th century, which led to mass starvation and consequent mass emigration. In the area covering the present day Republic of Ireland, the population reached about 6.5 million in the mid-1840s. Ten years later it was down to 5 million. The population continued a slow decline well into the 20th century, with the Republic recording a low of 2.8 million in the 1961 census.

During the 1960s, the population started to grow once more, although slowly as emigration was still common. In the 1990s the country entered a period of rapid economic growth as a result of the Celtic Tiger Irish economic boom, and the Republic started to receive immigration. Many former Irish emigrants returned home, and Ireland became an attractive destination for immigrants, from other member states EU such as Central Europe, but also from outside the EU such as Africa, Asia and elsewhere. With the 2008 onset of the Irish economic and banking crisis, the state's economy suffered, and Ireland has once again been experiencing net emigration of its citizens, but immigration remains high.

In November 2013, Eurostat reported that the Republic had the largest net emigration rate of any member state, at 7.6 emigrants per 1,000 population. However, it has the youngest population of any European Union member state and its population size is predicted to grow for many decades, in contrast with the declining population predicted for most European countries. A report published in 2008 predicted that the population would reach 6.7 million by 2060. The Republic has also been experiencing a baby boom, with increasing birth rates and overall fertility rates. Despite this, the total fertility rate is still below replacement depending on when the measurement is taken. The Irish fertility rate is still the highest of any European country. This increase is significantly fuelled by non-Irish immigration – in 2009, a quarter of all children born in the Republic were born to mothers who had immigrated from other countries.

Population 
The population of the Republic of Ireland was 5,123,536 people in 2022.
Demographic statistics as of 2019.
One birth every 8 minutes
One death every 16 minutes
One net migrant every 90 minutes
Net gain of one person every 14 minutes

 Geographic Population Distribution

Urban population (areas with >1,500 people): 62.0% (2011)

Rural population: 38.0% (2011)

Fertility 
The total fertility rate is the number of children born per woman.

Birth rate; 13.8 births/1,000 population (2018 est.) Country comparison to the world: 137th

Total fertility rate; 1.96 children born/woman (2018 est.) Country comparison to the world: 125th

Mother's mean age at first birth; 30.7 years (2015 est.)

Life expectancy 

Death rate; 6.6 deaths/1,000 population (2018 est.) Country comparison to the world: 140th

Source: UN World Population Prospects

Age structure 

Age structure

0–14 years: 21.37% (male 554,110 /female 529,067)
15–24 years: 11.92% (male 306,052 /female 297,890)
25–54 years: 42.86% (male 1,091,495 /female 1,080,594)
55–64 years: 10.53% (male 267,255 /female 266,438)
65 years and over: 13.32% (male 312,694 /female 362,455) (2018 est.)

Median age; total: 37.1 years

 male: 36.8 years
 female: 37.5 years (2018 est.)

Vital statistics 

c = Census results.

Current vital statistics

Ethnic groups

Immigration 

Ireland's immigration history (and of one of a multi-ethnic society) is most of that of a country of emigration, remaining exclusively mono-ethnic for the vast majority of its 20th century history, rather than one of net migration and increased ethnic and racial diversity. However, starting from the mid-1990s, with the rise of the 'Celtic Tiger', the nation shifted to one of a net receiver of immigration at a rapid pace, changing from one of the most 'homogeneous countries in the EU, to a country with a rate of change almost unparalleled in speed and scale'. The Celtic Tiger economic boom saw a large expansion of the labour market, which contributed to the large increase of immigration towards the country, with the additional enlargement of the European Union in 2004 and later 2007 contributing to this immigration wave massively. Additionally, asylum seekers rose dramatically as well: from 364 in 1994 to 11,634 in 2002, before falling off towards the end of the decade.

Net migration rate; 4 migrant(s)/1,000 population (2017 est.) Country comparison to the world: 28th

Nationalities

Ireland contains several immigrant communities, especially in Dublin and other cities across the country. The largest immigrant groups, with over 10,000 people, being Poles, Lithuanians, Romanians, Latvians, Indians, Americans, Brazilians, Spanish, Italians, French, Germans and the British.

Nationality of mothers 
Of the 58,443 births in 2021, there were 45,381 babies (77.7%) born to mothers of Irish nationality compared to 43,019 (76.9%) in 2020. There were 8.4% of births to mothers of EU15 to EU27 nationality, 2.0% of mothers were of UK nationality, and 2.1% were of EU14 nationality (excluding Ireland). Mothers of nationalities other than Ireland, UK and the EU accounted for 9.8% of total births registered. There were 0.04% of mothers where the nationality was not stated.

Support and accommodation 
Migrants are supported/represented by the Immigrant Council of Ireland, Irish Refugee Council, Movement of Asylum Seekers in Ireland, Nasc and the state's Irish Naturalisation and Immigration Service. They are mangaged by the International Protection Accommodation Service under the Department of Children, Equality, Disability, Integration and Youth (DCEDIY) as well being policed by the Garda National Immigration Bureau. Some minor parties have voiced opposition to immigration in the country and its capability to continue to let refugees in (including making claims that Ireland is "full") including the National Party and the Irish Freedom Party. The DCEDIY projected a shortfall of 15,000 beds for refugees in December 2022 and admitted that there was mounting pressure to house 65,000 people.

Approximately 7,400 refugee adults and children were projected to be living in 38 "direct provision" centres across 17 counties in the Republic of Ireland by the end of April 2020. The Government of Ireland have said that they project to end direct provision by 2024 and are looking towards alternative forms of accommodation.

Religion 

Ireland is a predominantly Christian country. The majority are Catholic; however, the number of people who declare themselves Catholic has been declining in recent years. Irreligion has almost doubled since 2011 with 9.8% declaring 'No Religion' in 2016, overtaking Protestantism as the second largest group in the state. The various Protestant and other Christian faiths represent 5.6. Immigration has brought other faiths, with Islam at 1.3%, other religions 2.4% and 2.6% gave no answer.

Languages 
English is the most commonly used language, with 84% of the population calling it their mother tongue. Irish is the first official language of the state, with 11% calling it their mother tongue. Irish is the main language of the Gaeltacht regions, where 96,628 people live. The main sign language used is Irish Sign Language.

Education 
Literacy rate; definition: age 15 and over who can read and write
total population: 99%
male: 99%
female: 99% (2003 est.)
School life expectancy (primary to tertiary education); total: 19 years
male: 19 years
female: 19 years (2016)

Employment and income 

For November 2022 the seasonally adjusted unemployment rate was:

Unchanged at 4.3% for males from October 2022, and down from 5.3% in November 2021.

Unchanged at 4.6% for females from October 2022, and down from 5.2% in November 2021.

Unchanged at 12.1% for persons aged 15–24 years (youth unemployment rate) from a revised rate of 12.1% in October 2022.

Down to 3.3% for persons aged 25–74 years from 3.4% in October 2022.

The median household disposable income in 2020 was €46,471, an increase of €2,556 (+5.8%) from the previous year. Disposable household income is gross household income less total tax, social insurance contributions, pension contributions and inter-household transfers paid.

See also

2011 census of Ireland
Irish diaspora
Irish population analysis
Stamp 4

Groups:
Lithuanians in Ireland
Polish minority in the Republic of Ireland
Romani people in Ireland
Turks in Ireland

Notes

References

External links
Irish Central Statistics Office
Historical Census Data
Marketing Ireland

 
Society of the Republic of Ireland